Runciman can refer to:

People 

Alexander Runciman, Scottish painter 
Bob Runciman, Canadian politician
David Runciman, British political scientist
Ewart Runciman, Australian politician
Hilda Runciman, Viscountess Runciman of Doxford, British Liberal Party politician
James Runciman, English teacher, author and journalist
John Runciman, Scottish painter
Richard Runciman Terry, English organist, choir director and musicologist
Ruth Runciman, former Chair of the UK Mental Health Act Commission
Ryan Runciman, New Zealand actor
Steven Runciman, British medieval historian
Walter Runciman, 1st Baron Runciman, shipping magnate, Liberal MP, and peer
Walter Runciman, 1st Viscount Runciman of Doxford, Liberal and later National Liberal MP and government minister
Walter Leslie Runciman, 2nd Viscount Runciman of Doxford
(Walter) Garry Runciman, 3rd Viscount Runciman of Doxford, British historical sociologist

Other 

 Runciman Award, annual literary award for works dealing with Greece or Hellenism
 Runciman railway station, situated on the North Island Main Trunk line in New Zealand, used 1874–1918
 Runciman Report, a series of letters concerning the Munich Agreement of 1938
 Runciman Mission, the diplomatic mission preceding the report
 Runciman Report, British 2000 police inquiry into the Misuse of Drugs Act 1971
 Runciman Rock, a rock part of the Argentine Islands
 Runciman's Disease, a fictional viral disease in the novel The War in 2020 by Ralph Peters